Rejvíz is the highest Silesian village in the Czech Republic (757 metres above sea level), and an administrative part of Zlaté Hory. It is also the most important tourist area in the northern part of the Protected Landscape Territory of Jeseník.

Culture

The Rejvíz Guesthouse is a popular sight because of its wooden interior from the early 20th century, carved by its owners, the Brauner brothers. Its part are also chairs with carved faces of regular customers of that time (image). In the time of the communist regime it was called Nosek Cottage (Noskova chata), after the first Czechoslovak communist Minister of Interior Václav Nosek.

Nature
Rejvíz is also a natural reserve, which was officially founded in 1955 and covers 3.97 km2. It is composed of the largest peat bog in Moravia and Moravian Silesia with small lakes of glacial origin. Recent studies have found the Rejvíz bog to be one of the best preserved woody raised bog complexes in Central Europe as core sampling reveals its organic deposit started to accumulate nine thousands years ago or even earlier. An instructive natural path was opened in 1970 and leads from the Rejvíz Guesthouse to the Great Moss Lake in the western part of the natural reserve. It is 1.5 km long and there are six stops with information boards.

The area of the Great Moss Lake is 1,692 m2. It is 68.5 m long and 41 m wide. Its depth is 2.95 m. Another lake, the Small Moss Lake, lies in the north-eastern part of the natural reserve. However, it is now completely overgrown with plants. The thickness of the peat layer is 6.6 m in this area, twice more than at the Great Moss Lake. The Small Moss Lake is not accessible to the public.

The peat bog is very rich in spiders. Other species living here include alpine newt, Carpathian newt and moor frog. moorland clouded yellow and subarctic hawker are glacial relicts. When the last ice age ended many species moved to northern territories of Europe, but peat bogs provided good conditions for some of them here too.

The area is surrounded with woods consisting mainly of spruces, which are replaced with mountain pines towards the centre. The meadows are very rich in species of various plants. Among the most common ones there are horsetails, wood club-rush, Cirsium rivulare and meadowsweet. There are also a lot of rare species, such as few-flower sedge, fibrous tussock-sedge, flea sedge, tufted loosestrife or Gladiolus imbricatus.

Many other plants can be seen at the moss lakes, for example Sphagnum moss, cotton-grass, marsh Labrador tea and carnivorous common sundew.

History
During the German occupation (World War II), the occupiers operated the E781 forced labour subcamp of the Stalag VIII-B/344 prisoner-of-war camp for Allied POWs in the village.

Notes

External links

In Czech:
Rejvíz instructive natural path
Rejvíz Guesthouse

Neighbourhoods in the Czech Republic
Populated places in Jeseník District
Nature reserves in the Czech Republic
Bogs of the Czech Republic
Geography of the Olomouc Region
Tourist attractions in the Olomouc Region